Edlandsvatnet is a lake in the municipality of Gjesdal in Rogaland county, Norway.  The  lake lies just south of the large village of Ålgård, immediately southwest of the lake Limavatnet.  The European route E39 highway runs along the northern shore of the lake.  The lake empties into the river Figgjoelva on the northwestern end of the lake.  The lake has many brown trout in it.

See also
List of lakes in Norway

References

Gjesdal
Lakes of Rogaland